Manilal Chhotalal Parekh (1885-1967), a Gujarati convert to Anglican church, was an Indian Christian theologian, and the founder of Hindu Church of Christ—free from Western influence - opposing Western and institutional nature of Christianity in India.

He developed a new syncretistic Jesus-Yogi model, identifying himself as a Hindu disciple of Jesus Christ—although, Jesus never knew of Yoga, Parekh credited him 
with being a Yogi by birth. He authored several books, especially A Hindu's Portrait of Christ that constructed a portrait of Christ from a Hindu point of view.

Biography

Early life
Parekh was born in 1885 at Rajkot of western Gujarat, India, in a family already following Jainism and Vaishnavism, specifically followed by his father.

It is said that his illness drew him closer to God in 1903; consequently, he read the entire Bible and a book about Swami Narayana in Gujarati language. Prior to that, at the age of fifteen, he seems to have already read The Use of Life written by John Lubbock, 1st Baron Avebury, and also The Imitation of Christ influencing him in moral and spiritual attraction at a younger age. After entering the University in Bombay, he was influenced and introduced to Christ through Christ-centric writings of Keshub Chunder Sen, a renowned leader of Brahmo Samaj; later, he served at Church of New Dispensation, founded by Keshub Chunder Sen,  for some years. He was baptized to an Anglican church in Bombay on 6 February 1918, and thereby  embraced Christianity. He considered himself as "Christian Hindu", having interpreted Hindu as a name[term] derived from river Indus in both national and cultural context, rather than religious context.

Hindu-Christian baptism

He was baptised to Anglican Church, as he believed that he had no right to preach Christ without openly professing to be a disciple of Christ—he took baptism considering it as "a purely spiritual sacramental, signifying the dedication of the new disciple of Christ." He felt that new disciple or convert of Christ ought to remain within his community and considered baptism in India as "joining community which stands as a distinct social and political body with its own airs and aspirations which are very often antithetical and far from Christian"; hence, he lived as a Hindu-Christian, consciously Christian, but in Hindu surroundings like Brahmabandhab Upadhyay, Narayan Vaman Tilak, and Pandita Ramabai—all these were said to be Hindus by birth, but claimed to remain Christians. He denounced Westernized church, as he felt it had become more communal body that was more political and social, rather than spiritual;furthermore, he felt culturally Church was "anti-national," and lost its identity as Christian.

Hindu Church of Christ
Having studied Bible, he interpreted the victory of Jesus in accepting Cross in a non-violent way; he considered the Christian church as the invention of Europeans and denounced the Christian church to had become a civil community, instead of a spiritual fellowship. According to him:

Having disillusioned by the westernized and materialistic attitude of the Church, he severed his ties with missions and churches, but remained committed to Jesus Christ portraying himself as "Hindu disciple of Christ." As he was not comfortable and against the traditional concept of the Church as a separate religious community, he more or less kept loose association 
with Anglican church; instead, he advocated the House Church as a fellowship within the framework of Hindu cultural, and social categories.

He founded the Hindu Church of Christ free from the Western concept of Church;furthermore, he named his home in Rajkot as Oriental Christ House.

Gandhi Vs Parekh
Parek who knew and met Gandhi, co-authored Mahatma Gandhi An Essay in Appreciation with R.M. Gray, like Gandhi mulled over the concept of Swadharmagraha, later named it as Hindu Swadharmagraha, insisting on the religion of one's birth; however, Parekh parted Gandhi preferring to create an eclectic religion—composed of various[best] doctrines and beliefs. Accordingly, Parekh conceptualised Hindu Swadharmagraha with more space to Christ and prophets of foreign religions, as God's own messengers.

Like Gandhi, he affirmed full spiritual fellowship was possible without breaking Caste-system; furthermore, he defended and advocated the practice of caste system in the Indian churches.

Gandhi, being a non-Christian acknowledged the moral excellence of Jesus Christ and the relevance of his teachings, with or without a personal commitment to him—Gandhi didn't convert to Christianity. Parekh, a convert from non-Christian religion to Christianity, personally committed to Christ with conversion by retaining his former religious identity—multiple religious belonging. Gandhi directed his apologetic against the claims that Christianity is a superior religion, while Parekh tried to fuse together Christianity and all other theistic religions retaining Hindu identity.

Gandhi preferred ethical model of Jesus and was more interested in his teachings rather than historical Jesus, while Parekh formulated his own ascetical Jesus-Yogi model. Parekh didn't use religion for political reasons, while Gandhi blended religion into politics—both Gandhi and Parekh, however, supported Harijan [politics] like eating with them and worshipping with them, with no regard to education in any of their doctrines.

Jesus yogi model
Parekh believed that Jesus had achieved the highest communion with God, and asserted that Jesus' power to do miracles can be done by every human being through the practice of yoga. In his A Hindu's Portrait of Jesus Christ, he considered the risen Christ as fully human than the historical Jesus. He credited Jesus with being a yogi by birth, although nowhere it is mentioned that Jesus knew nor followed yoga technique.

A Hindu's Portrait of Christ
He published A Hindu's Portrait of Jesus Christ in 1953 at Rajkot and proclaimed as "My most humble tribute to Jesus Christ, whose 'Hindu disciple' i have been for the last forty years." This book is by and large considered as a profound study of Jesus Christ by any Hindu in a systematic way in dealing with Jesus' life and meaning. His portrait of Jesus is largely drawn from Synoptic Gospels, following the Markan Chronology of events.

Salient points
 Regarding the Virgin birth of Christ, he says "The Hindus have treated it as a pious myth."
 Jesus as a great preacher or prophet, certainly beyond Mahavira and Buddha, as he turned instinctively to the poor and the despised, the outcaste and the sinner.
 Denounces Fourth Gospel (aka Gospel of John) denying Jesus raising of Lazarus, however, he had no doubt that Jesus worked miracles. According to him, the body of Jesus was not raised, but remained where it was; however, the Resurrection was only in appearance like that of Swami Narayana.
 Regarding the death of Christ, he observes "There is no doubt, however, that we are here face to face with the greatest tragedy enacted on the earth."
 Jesus is more than an Avatara, but a bit less than God.

Works

 A Hindu's Portrait of Christ: A Gospel of God's Free Gift of His Sonship, 1953.
 Sri Swami Narayana : (a gospel of Bhagwat-dharma, or, God in redemptive action).
 Mahatma Gandhi An Essay in Appreciation.
 The Brahma Samaj : a short history.
 Keshub Chunder Sen: His Relation to Christianity.
 Christian Proselytism in India - A Great and Growing Menace, 1947.

See also
 Insider movements among Hindus

References

External links
 A Jain Believer in Christ - Manilal C. Parekh
The State Of Bombay vs Shastri Yagna Purushadasji on 3 October 1958

1885 births
1967 deaths
Indian Christian theologians
Gujarati people
Christian and Hindu interfaith dialogue
People in interfaith dialogue
World Christianity scholars